Dorothy A. Atabong is a Canadian actress, writer and producer. She is best known for Sound of Tears for which she’s won various awards including an Africa Movie Academy Award in 2015.

Career
Atabong received positive reviews for theatre productions such as Wedding Band, The Africa Trilogy by Volcano Theatre, a part of Luminato Arts Festival and the Stratford Festival, The Canadian Stage Company and Studio 180 production of The Overwhelming.

Atabong published a romantic novel, The Princess of Kaya, in 2002, which she later adapted into a screenplay. Her feature length script, Daisy’s Heart, won Best Low Budget Script at the 2011 Female Eye Film Festival in Toronto. She also wrote, produced and starred in Sound of Tears, a short film which premiered at the Montreal World Film Festival. The film won the 2015 Africa Movie Academy Award for Best Diaspora Short and also garnered a Platinum Remi at the 48th WorldFest Houston Film Festival.

TV appearances include the award winning television series Mayday, Ocean Landing (African Hijack) for the Discovery Channel; Degrassi: The Next Generation and The Line for The Movie Network. Atabong also starred in Glo, a part of The Africa Trilogy directed by Josette Bushell-Mingo, and led a cast of 11 in the role of Julia in the acclaimed play Wedding Band by Alice Childress. Other roles include The Studio 180 and Canadian Stage Company production of The Overwhelming by J. T. Rogers, and Theatre Awakening’s production of In Darfur at Theatre Passe Muraille for SummerWorks, for which she won the Emerging Artist Award.

Personal
Atabong married in 2008 and has two sons, one born in 2011 the other in 2015. In 2013 Atabong appeared on the CBC Radio show Metro Morning with Matt Galloway to discuss the problem of family violence against women, and her film Sound Of Tears for the National Day of Remembrance and Action on Violence Against Women on December 6, 2013.

Filmography and Theatre

Film

Television

Theatre

Awards

References

External links 
 Official Website
 

21st-century Canadian actresses
Cameroonian emigrants to Canada
Cameroonian film directors
Actresses from Toronto
Black Canadian actresses
Cameroonian actresses
Canadian film actresses
Cameroonian women
Cameroonian women writers
Living people
Film directors from Toronto
Black Canadian filmmakers
Canadian women film directors
Writers from Toronto
21st-century Cameroonian writers
21st-century Cameroonian women writers
Year of birth missing (living people)